= Sara Katharina de Bronovo =

Dutch nurse (1817–1887)

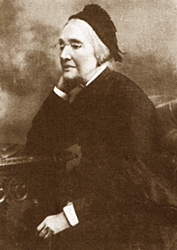
Sara Katharina de Bronovo

Sara Katharina de Bronovo (born in Rotterdam on 17 February 1817; died in The Hague on 18 June 1887), was a Dutch nurse. She was founder and first director of the first Diaconess hospital in The Hague. The hospital was later named, Ziekenhuis Bronovo, for her.

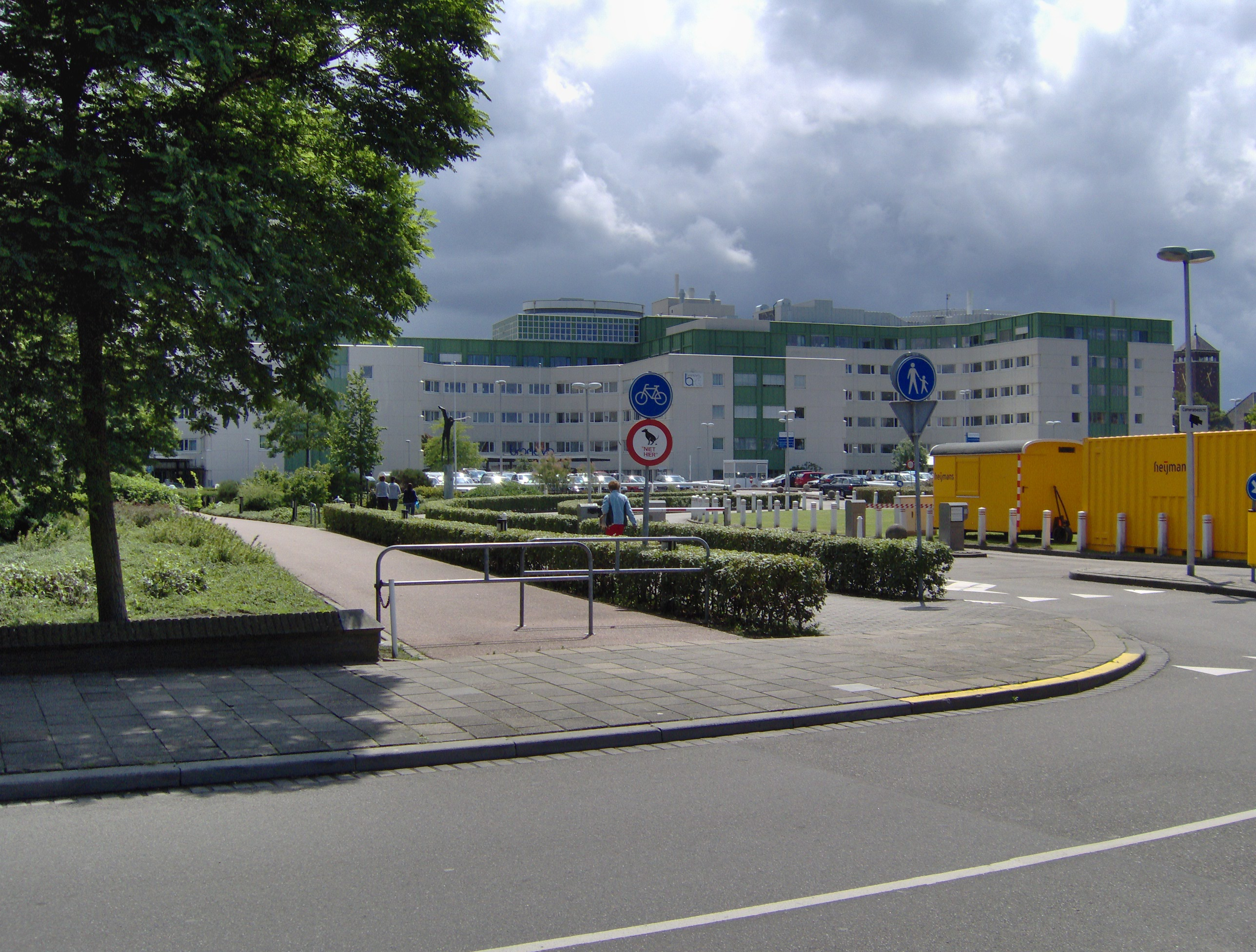
Ziekenhuis Bronovo hospital

The hospital was initially called Gravenhaagsche Diaconessen- Inrichting (The Hague Deaconesses’ Institute). The hospital is now well known for its association with the Dutch Royal family. The wards are named after family members and members of that family have been born at the hospital.
